Mugzy's Move is an album by the American band Royal Crown Revue, released in 1996. The album cover art was inspired by classic pulp fiction.

The album peaked at No. 11 on Billboard Jazz Albums chart. The band supported Mugzy's Move by touring with the Pretenders.

Production
The album was produced by Ted Templeman, who had also signed Royal Crown Revue. The band recorded it as a septet. The lyrics were inspired by frontman Eddie Nichols's love of mid-20th century crime movies and novels.

"Beyond the Sea" is a cover of the song made famous by Bobby Darin. "Honey Child" is a version of the Willie Dixon song. "Hey Pachuco!", which was met with questions related to cultural appropriation, was first heard on the soundtrack to The Mask. "Datin' with No Dough" is an autobiographical song.

Critical reception

The Province wrote: "A self-conscious collision (or collusion?) of film noir, pulp fiction and big band swing, Royal Crown Revue are Kansas City rhythm and blues out of sync and out of time but enormously entertaining." The Florida Times-Union deemed Mugzy's Move "a great recording with a swinging big band sound that can match the energy of any act today." The Orange County Register concluded that "if there's a flaw, it's that singer Eddie Nichols' voice doesn't have the requisite range and suave soulfulness."

The Honolulu Star-Bulletin called the album "a refreshingly original musical journey through the seedier side of the SoCal scene—retro but contemporary." The Baltimore Sun noted the "energetic, muscular sound, thoroughly grounded in California zoot suit culture." The Advocate opined that "for all its hep cat energy, attitude and chops, Royal Crown Revue's retro-swing-bop comes off like an imitation of an imitation."

AllMusic wrote: "Although the band is energetic and proficient, their cutesey originals and campy album art give their music an aura of being some sort of kitschy joke."

Track listing

References

1996 albums
Warner Records albums
Albums produced by Ted Templeman
Swing revival albums